Ravi Hasmukh Patel (born 4 August 1991) is an English cricketer.  Patel is a right-handed batsman who bowls slow left-arm orthodox.  He was born in Harrow, London and educated at Merchant Taylors' School, Northwood.

Patel made his first-class debut for Middlesex against Oxford MCCU in 2010.  In that same season he also made his List A debut against the touring Australians.  In 2011, while studying for his degree in economics at Loughborough University, he played first-class cricket for Loughborough MCCU, making three appearances against Leicestershire and Kent.

His contract was not renewed by Middlesex following the 2018 season.

References

External links

1991 births
Living people
People from Harrow, London
People educated at Merchant Taylors' School, Northwood
Alumni of Loughborough University
English cricketers
Middlesex cricketers
Loughborough MCCU cricketers
Essex cricketers
North v South cricketers
British sportspeople of Indian descent
British Asian cricketers